The Charleston Mercury was a secessionist newspaper in Charleston, South Carolina, founded by Henry L. Pinckney in 1819. He was its sole editor for fifteen years. It ceased publication with the Union Army occupation of Charleston. After the American Civil War, publication resumed in November 1866 before the paper closed permanently two years later in 1868.

History
During the American Civil War, the paper was "strongly secessionist", calling upon South Carolinian men to take up arms to defend the South. Its owner, Robert Barnwell Rhett, had two plantations and 190 enslaved persons. The paper was critical of Davis and Confederate generals, in contrast with its pro-Davis competitor the Charleston Courier.

Humorist George William Bagby was a Richmond, Virginia correspondent of the Charleston Mercury during the Civil War era and "covered the politics of the war and made a reputation for Hermes, his pen name, as a fearless writer who would criticize Confederate General Robert E. Lee as easily as Confederate President Jefferson Davis".

References

External links
Library of Congress

Mass media in Charleston, South Carolina
Defunct newspapers published in South Carolina
Separatism in the United States
Publications established in 1819
Publications disestablished in 1868
1819 establishments in South Carolina
1868 establishments in South Carolina
19th-century in Charleston, South Carolina